AustinShow (also written as Austin Show) is an American Twitch streamer, YouTuber, and television personality. He is known for hosting various talk and dating shows, including Love or Host. In 2022, he co-hosted the game show Name Your Price alongside Will Neff and JustaMinx on G4.

Career 
Austin began streaming Runescape on Twitch in 2013. He streamed under the name RajjPatel, which he coined himself. He also spoke in a faux Indian accent. Austin would later begin hosting various talk and dating shows on his stream. He created The Rajjchelor, a dating show inspired by The Bachelor, and Rajj Royale, a debate show, both of which are presented in an elimination-type format. Notable guests that have appeared on the shows include James Charles, Pokimane, Destiny, Mia Malkova, and Lil Nas X.

Due to the live, unscripted nature of Austin's broadcasts, a number of controversial incidents have occurred during the shows. In March 2018, a streamer by the name of Aqualadora admitted to intentionally killing a dog after Austin asked her to reveal the worst thing she had ever done. In March 2020, Twitch banned streamer Kaceytron after she made insensitive comments regarding the COVID-19 pandemic during one of Austin's broadcasts.

On June 12, 2020, Austin announced that he would be dropping the RajjPatel moniker entirely. The name had generated controversy in the past due to his portrayal of Indian people as a white-passing man. In a statement released on Twitter, he stated, "I don't want any part of my image, name, or persona to be inappropriately borrowed from a culture that I don't have the right to represent. So, moving forward, I will be going by my first name, Austin, and rebranding everything as a derivative of that." His flagship shows The Rajjchelor and Rajj Royale were renamed to Love or Host and The Royale respectively.

In July 2020, it was announced that Austin would be the host of a game show titled Dare Package on streaming media channel VENN.

On July 11, 2020, Austin, along with rapper Wiz Khalifa hosted a charity stream for Rise Above the Disorder, a non-profit that focuses on providing mental health services to people of color.

At GlitchCon 2020, a virtual version of TwitchCon, Austin hosted a talent show featuring celebrity judges Andy Milonakis and T-Pain.

On March 11, 2021, Austin joined gaming organization 100 Thieves as a content creator.

On February 3, 2022, Austin signed with G4 to host Name Your Price, a 1970s-themed game show inspired by The Price Is Right, with Will Neff and JustaMinx. On February 10, it premiered on Austin's Twitch channel.

Personal life 
Austin is openly gay. He came out via Twitter in April 2020, saying, "My sexuality isn't a meme. I identify as what I would say 'mostly' gay, but maybe bisexual because sometimes I find some women attractive."

Austin describes himself as "fairly liberal". He supported Joe Biden in the 2020 United States presidential election.

Austin is of Lebanese and Irish descent.

References 

21st-century American LGBT people
1994 births
Gay men
LGBT people from Oregon
LGBT YouTubers
Living people
Twitch (service) streamers
American_people_of_Lebanese_descent
American_people_of_Irish_descent